Medijana is one of five city municipalities which constitute the city of Niš. It is the central and the most populous city municipality of Niš with the population of 85,969 inhabitants.

Geography
The municipality borders Pantelej municipality in the north, Niška Banja municipality in the east, Palilula municipality in the south, and Crveni Krst municipality in the west.

Demographics
According to the 2011 census, the municipality had a population of 85,969 inhabitants, with 81,327 in the eponymous settlement.

Settlements 
The municipality consists of two settlements: Brzi Brod (population 4,642), a rural settlement and Medijana (population 81,327), a part of a larger urban settlement of Niš.

Neighbourhoods
The neighbourhoods composing Medijana municipality are:

 Brzi Brod
 Bulevar Nemanjića
 Bulevar Djindjića
 Čair
Centar
 Duvanište
 Kičevo
Marger
 Medijana
Trg Kralja Aleksandra
 Trošarina

See also
 Subdivisions of Serbia
 Niš

References

External links

 Градска општина Медијана

Municipalities of Niš